Pravaya Raychikha is a rural locality (a selo) in Uspenovsky Selsoviet of Bureysky District, Amur Oblast, Russia. The population was 23 as of 2018. There are 2 streets.

Geography 
Pravaya Raychikha is located on the right bank of the Raychikha River, 74 km southwest of Novobureysky (the district's administrative centre) by road. Uspenovka is the nearest rural locality.

References 

Rural localities in Bureysky District